The 2008 Temple Owls football team represented Temple University in the college 2008 NCAA Division I FBS football season. Temple competed as a member of the Mid-American Conference (MAC) East Division.  The team was coached by Al Golden and played their home game in Lincoln Financial Field.

Schedule

References

Temple
Temple Owls football seasons
Temple Owls football